Kristoffer Jakobsen (born 9 September 1994) is a Swedish World Cup alpine ski racer who specialises in the slalom discipline. He represented Sweden in the 2018 Winter Olympics and was seventh in the slalom.

At his third World Championships in 2021, Jakobsen was part of the Swedish team that earned a silver medal in the combined men's and women's team competition. He attained his first World Cup podium in December 2021 with a runner-up finish in a slalom at Val d'Isère, France.

World Cup results

Season standings

Race podiums
 0 wins
 2 podiums – (2 SL); 11 top tens (11 SL)

World Championship results

Olympic results

References

External links

1994 births
Living people
Swedish male alpine skiers
Alpine skiers at the 2018 Winter Olympics
Alpine skiers at the 2022 Winter Olympics
Olympic alpine skiers of Sweden